The Coronado National Memorial commemorates the first organized expedition into the Southwest by conquistador Francisco Vásquez de Coronado in 1540. The memorial is located in a natural setting on the Mexico–United States border on the southeast flank of the Huachuca Mountains south of Sierra Vista, Arizona and is bordered to the north and west by Coronado National Forest. Within the memorial is an overlook at Montezuma Pass where the Coronado expedition entered modern Arizona. The memorial confirms the ties that bind the United States and Mexico.

History
Official statements indicate that it was initially designed as a gesture of goodwill and cooperation between the United States and Mexico, through the recognition of Coronado's 1540 expedition to the area.  For example, in 1939 the House Committee on Foreign Affairs noted:

As a result of this expedition, what has been truly characterized by historians as one of the greatest land expeditions the world has known, a new civilization was established in the great American Southwest.

And E. K. Burlew, Acting Secretary of the Interior added in 1940:

To commemorate permanently the explorations of Francisco Vásquez de Coronado. . .would be of great value in advancing the relationship of the United States and Mexico upon a friendly basis of cultural understanding. . . [It would] stress the history and problems of the two countries and would encourage cooperation for the advancement of their common interests.

Thus the site was first designated Coronado International Memorial on August 18, 1941, with the hope that a comparable adjoining area would be established in Mexico.  The arrangement might have been similar to the Waterton-Glacier International Peace Park between the United States and Canada.  However, despite interest by the government of Mexico, the Mexican memorial was never created, therefore Congress changed the authorized designation to a national memorial on July 9, 1952.  The memorial was established by Harry S. Truman on November 5 of that year.  As with all historic areas administered by the National Park Service, the national memorial was listed on the National Register of Historic Places on October 15, 1966.

In December 2020, explosives and bulldozers were used to clear a path to improve the border barrier.

Recreation
The Memorial hosts eight miles (12.8 km) of hiking trails to accommodate a wide range of skill levels, ranging from an interpretive nature trail less than one mile round-trip, to a 6.2 mile trail which gains more than 1,300 feet in elevation and offers hikers a direct route to a border marker between the states of Arizona and Sonora. 

After a 1978 boundary expansion, the Memorial also began protecting Coronado Cave, a 600 foot-long cavern containing a variety of formations and historic graffiti which visitors can explore independently.

Gallery

See also
 List of national memorials of the United States

References

 The National Parks: Index 2001–2003. Washington: U.S. Department of the Interior.

External links

 Official NPS website: Coronado National Memorial
 American Southwest, a National Park Service Discover Our Shared Heritage Travel Itinerary

1952 establishments in Arizona
Geography of Cochise County, Arizona
Mexico–United States border
Monuments and memorials in Arizona
Monuments and memorials on the National Register of Historic Places in Arizona
National Memorials of the United States
Parks in Arizona
Peace parks
Protected areas established in 1952
Protected areas of Cochise County, Arizona
Spanish colonization of the Americas
National Park Service areas in Arizona
National Register of Historic Places in Cochise County, Arizona